The Winged Mystery is a 1917 American silent war film directed by Joseph De Grasse and starring Franklyn Farnum, Claire Du Brey and Rosemary Theby.

Cast
 Franklyn Farnum as Capt. August Sieger / Louis Siever
 Claire Du Brey as Gerda Anderson
 Rosemary Theby as Shirley Wayne
 Charles Hill Mailes as Josiah Wayne
 Sam De Grasse as Mortimer Eddington
 T.D. Crittenden as Henry Waltham Steele
 Fred Montague as Capt. Bernard

References

Bibliography
 Robert B. Connelly. The Silents: Silent Feature Films, 1910-36, Volume 40, Issue 2. December Press, 1998.

External links
 

1917 films
1917 war films
1910s English-language films
American silent feature films
American war films
American black-and-white films
Universal Pictures films
Films directed by Joseph De Grasse
Silent war films
1910s American films